Rapidan Township is a township in Blue Earth County, Minnesota, United States. The population was 1,101 as of the 2010 census.

History
Rapidan Township was organized in 1865, and named after the Rapidan River.

Geography
Public Land Survey System (PLSS) of the United States: Township 107 North, Range 27 West, Fifth Meridian, 22,819 Acres.

Unincorporated community
 Rapidan at

Adjacent townships
 South Bend Township (north)
 Mankato Township (northeast)
 Decoria Township (east)
 Beauford Township (southeast)
 Lyra Township (south)
 Vernon Center Township (southwest)
 Garden City Township (west)
 Judson Township (northwest)

Cemeteries
Cemeteries in the township include the following: Calvary Lutheran, Holberg, Stratton Family Cemetery and Saint John's Lutheran.

Demographics
As of the census of 2000, there were 1,061 people, 393 households, and 319 families residing in the township. There were 409 housing units at an average density of 11.5/sq mi (4.4/km). The racial makeup of the township was 98.49% White, 0.19% African American, 0.47% Asian, and 0.85% from two or more races. Hispanic or Latino of any race were 0.38% of the population.

There were 393 households, out of which 36.4% had children under the age of 18 living with them, 73.8% were married couples living together, 4.6% had a female householder with no husband present, and 18.8% were non-families. 17.3% of all households were made up of individuals, and 7.1% had someone living alone who was 65 years of age or older. The average household size was 2.70 and the average family size was 3.04.

In the township the population was spread out, with 25.9% under the age of 18, 7.4% from 18 to 24, 25.7% from 25 to 44, 31.3% from 45 to 64, and 9.6% who were 65 years of age or older. The median age was 39 years. For every 100 females, there were 106.4 males. For every 100 females age 18 and over, there were 104.7 males.

The median income for a household in the township was $85,839, and the median income for a family was $60,938. Males had a median income of $39,063 versus $23,971 for females. The per capita income for the township was $24,856. About 2.2% of families and 3.2% of the population were below the poverty line, including 3.7% of those under age 18 and 5.8% of those age 65 or over.

References
 United States National Atlas
 United States Census Bureau 2007 TIGER/Line Shapefiles
 United States Board on Geographic Names (GNIS)

Townships in Blue Earth County, Minnesota
Mankato – North Mankato metropolitan area
Townships in Minnesota